This Coming Gladness is an album by Josephine Foster, released in 2008.

Track listing

References

2008 albums
Josephine Foster albums